Trčkov Grič (sometimes Trčkov Hrib) is a small settlement in the hills northwest of Stara Vrhnika in the Municipality of Vrhnika in the Inner Carniola region of Slovenia.

History
Trčkov Grič became a separate settlement in 2002, when it was separated from the settlement of Zaplana. It was also previously a hamlet of Podlipa.

References

External links
Trčkov Grič on Geopedia

Populated places in the Municipality of Vrhnika